Herpysma is a genus of flowering plants from the orchid family, Orchidaceae. It contains only one known species, Herpysma longicaulis, native to Southeast Asia (Yunnan, Bhutan, Assam, Sumatra, Myanmar, Nepal, Bhutan, Thailand, Vietnam).

See also 
 List of Orchidaceae genera

References 

  (1833) Edwards's Botanical Register 19: , sub pl. 1618.
  (2003). Genera Orchidacearum 3: 98 ff. Oxford University Press.
  2005. Handbuch der Orchideen-Namen. Dictionary of Orchid Names. Dizionario dei nomi delle orchidee. Ulmer, Stuttgart

External links 

Cranichideae genera
Goodyerinae
Orchids of Asia
Monotypic Orchidoideae genera